Gnorimoschema albangulatum is a moth in the family Gelechiidae. It was described by Annette Frances Braun in 1926. It is found in North America, where it has been recorded from Alberta and Manitoba.

References

Gnorimoschema
Moths described in 1926